Bridget Jones's Diary is a 2001 romantic comedy film directed by Sharon Maguire and written by Richard Curtis, Andrew Davies, and Helen Fielding. A co-production of the United Kingdom, United States and France, it is based on Fielding's 1996 novel of the same name, which is a reinterpretation of Jane Austen's 1813 novel Pride and Prejudice. The adaptation stars Renée Zellweger as Bridget Jones, a 32-year-old British single woman, who writes a diary which focuses on the things she wishes to happen in her life. However, her life changes when two men vie for her affection, portrayed by Colin Firth and Hugh Grant. Jim Broadbent and Gemma Jones appear in supporting roles. Production began in August 2000 and ended in November 2000, and took place largely on location in London and the home counties.

Bridget Jones's Diary premiered on 4 April 2001 in the United Kingdom and was released to theatres on 13 April 2001 simultaneously in the United Kingdom and in the United States. It grossed over $280 million worldwide and received positive reviews, with critics highlighting Zellweger's titular performance, which garnered her a nomination for the Academy Award for Best Actress. Over the years, it has been hailed as part of the English pop culture, with Bridget Jones being cited as a British cultural icon.

The success of the film spawned a Bridget Jones franchise with two equally successful sequels being released, Bridget Jones: The Edge of Reason (2004) and Bridget Jones's Baby (2016).

Plot
Bridget Jones is 32, single, engagingly imperfect, and worried about her weight. She works as a publicity assistant at a publishing company in London where her main focus is fantasizing about her boss, Daniel Cleaver.

At her parents' New Year party, Bridget is introduced to Mark Darcy, a childhood acquaintance and handsome barrister, son of her parents' friends. Mark calls Bridget foolish and vulgar, and she thinks he is arrogant and rude. Overhearing Mark grumble to his mother about her attempt to set him up with "a verbally incontinent spinster who smokes like a chimney, drinks like a fish, and dresses like her mother", Bridget forms the New Year's resolution to turn her life around. She begins keeping a diary to chronicle her attempts to stop smoking, stop drinking, lose weight, and find her Mr. Right.

Bridget and Daniel begin to flirt heavily at work, ahead of an important book launch, at which Bridget bumps into Mark and his glamorous and haughty colleague Natasha. Bridget leaves with Daniel and they have dinner, despite Daniel's notorious reputation as a womaniser. Daniel tells Bridget that he and Mark were formerly friends but as Mark slept with his fiancée, they now hate each other. Bridget and Daniel start dating.

Bridget is invited to a family party, originally a "Tarts & Vicars" costume party, so she ties it into a mini-break weekend with Daniel. They spend the day before the party at a country inn where Mark and Natasha are also staying. The morning of the party, Daniel says he must return to London for work and leaves Bridget dressed as a Playboy bunny to endure the party alone. When she returns to London and drops in on Daniel, she discovers his American colleague, Lara naked in his flat. Bridget cuts ties with him and immediately searches for a new career. She lands a new job in television, and when Daniel pleads with her to stay, she declares that she would "rather have a job wiping Saddam Hussein's arse".

Bridget attends a friend's long-standing dinner party, where she is the only unaccompanied person. Once again she crosses paths with Mark and Natasha. He privately confesses to Bridget that, despite her faults, he likes her "just as you are". Sometime later, he allows Bridget an exclusive TV interview in a landmark legal case which boosts her career and allows her to see him differently.

Bridget begins to develop feelings for Mark, and when she misguidedly and somewhat disastrously, attempts to cook her own birthday dinner party, he comes to her rescue. After a happy dinner celebration with Bridget's friends and Mark, a drunken Daniel arrives and temporarily monopolises Bridget's attention. Mark leaves, but returns to challenge Daniel and they fight in the street, eventually smashing through a window of a Greek restaurant. The fight eventually ends, with Bridget chiding Mark and he leaving, but after a self-serving appeal from Daniel, she rejects him as well.

Bridget's mother, Pamela, has left Bridget's father Colin and begun an affair with perma-tanned shopping channel presenter Julian. When the affair ends, she returns to the Jones's family home and off-handedly reveals that Mark and Daniel's falling-out resulted from Daniel (then Mark's best friend at Cambridge University) sleeping with Mark's wife which Mark walked in on, not the other way around.

At the Darcys' ruby wedding anniversary party the same day, Bridget confesses her feelings for Mark, only to learn that he and Natasha have accepted jobs in New York and are on the verge of an engagement, according to Mark's father. Bridget interrupts the toast with an emotionally moving speech that peters out as she realises the hopelessness of her position. Although her words have an effect on Mark, he still flies to New York. Bridget's friends rally to repair her broken heart with a surprise trip to Paris, but as they are about to leave, Mark appears at Bridget's flat.

Just as they are about to kiss for the first time, Bridget flies to her bedroom to change into sexier underwear. Mark peeks at her diary, reads her earlier unflattering opinions of him, and leaves. Bridget, realizing what he has read and fearing she has lost him again, runs outside after him in the snow in her tigerskin-print underwear and a thin cardigan, but doesn't find him. Disheartened, she is about to return home when he reappears, she apologises and he presents her with a new diary, "to make a fresh start". They kiss in the snow-covered street.

Cast

Salman Rushdie, Julian Barnes, Jeffrey Archer and Honor Blackman have cameos in the film.

Andrew Davies, screenwriter of the 1995 television adaptation of Pride and Prejudice, collaborated on the screenplays for the 2001 and 2004 Bridget Jones films and Crispin Bonham-Carter, who played Mr. Bingley in that adaptation, appeared in a minor role. The self-referential in-joke between the projects convinced Colin Firth to accept the role of Mark Darcy, as it gave him an opportunity to ridicule and liberate himself from his Pride and Prejudice character.

Production
Working Title Films acquired the film rights of the novel in 1997 before it became a best-seller.

Casting
Actresses who were considered for the role of Bridget Jones were Helena Bonham Carter, Cate Blanchett, Emily Watson, Rachel Weisz (who was considered too beautiful for the role), and Cameron Diaz. Toni Collette declined the role because she was on Broadway starring in The Wild Party at the time. Kate Winslet was also considered, but, at 24, the producers decided she was too young.

Zellweger's casting in late May 2000 concluded a two-year search. Producer Eric Fellner explained that she "brings enormous character and conviction to the part". Maguire said of Zellweger, "I saw in Renee a gift few people have, that she was able to straddle comedy and emotion." Zellweger worked on her accent with  Barbara Berkery, who had helped Gwyneth Paltrow for Shakespeare in Love. She also gained 20 pounds (9 kg) for the part. To prepare for the role, Zellweger worked at the producers' request at London book publishers Picador as a trainee in the publicity department. Before the film was released, a considerable amount of controversy surrounded the casting of the American Zellweger as what some saw as a quintessentially British heroine. However, her performance, including her south-eastern English accent, is widely considered to be of a high standard.

In July 2000, the leading male roles were given to Colin Firth and Hugh Grant. The director of the film, Sharon Maguire, is one of Fielding's friends, on whom the film's character "Shazzer" (English slang for Sharon) was reportedly based. In the film, Shazzer is played by Sally Phillips.

Filming
Principal photography began on 1 August 2000 and concluded on 5 November 2000. The crew spent six weeks shooting in and around London. Locations used included Shad Thames where Bridget and Daniel have their first date, the Royal Courts of Justice, St Pancras railway station and Tower Bridge. Scenes were filmed at Stoke Park in Buckinghamshire where Bridget and Daniel ventured to for their mini-break. Wrotham Park in Hertfordshire served as the Darcys' home. Stansted Airport doubled as JFK Airport in New York, while Syon House in Brentford featured as the venue for the anniversary party. The crew filmed for four days at Snowshill in Gloucestershire which featured as the home of Bridget Jones's family. After six weeks of shooting on location, the crew moved to Shepperton Studios in Surrey.

Reception

Box office 
Bridget Jones's Diary grossed $71.5 million in the United States and Canada, and $210.5 million in other territories, for a worldwide total of $282 million, against a production budget of $25 million.

The film made $10.7 million in its opening weekend, finishing third. Dropping just 5.7% in its second weekend, the film made $10.2 million and finished first the following weekend.

Critical response 

On review aggregation website Rotten Tomatoes the film holds an approval rating of 80% based on 162 reviews, with an average rating of 6.9/10. The site's critics consensus reads: "Though there was controversy over the choice of casting, Zellweger's Bridget Jones is a sympathetic, likable, funny character, giving this romantic comedy a lot of charm." Metacritic assigned the film a weighted average score of 66 out of 100 based on 33 critics, indicating "generally favorable reviews". Audiences polled by CinemaScore gave the film an average grade of "B+" on an A+ to F scale.

Critic Roger Ebert gave the film  out of 4 possible stars, writing: "Made against all odds into a funny and charming movie that understands the charm of the original, and preserves it."

Accolades
The film is recognised by American Film Institute in these lists:
 2008: AFI's 10 Top 10:
 Nominated Romantic Comedy Film

Renée Zellweger was nominated for the Academy Award for Best Actress, the BAFTA Award for Best Actress in a Leading Role, the Broadcast Film Critics Association Award for Best Actress, the Empire Award for Best Actress, the Golden Globe Award for Best Actress – Motion Picture Musical or Comedy, the MTV Movie Award for Best Kiss (shared with Colin Firth), the Satellite Award for Best Actress – Motion Picture Musical or Comedy, the Screen Actors Guild Award for Outstanding Performance by a Female Actor in a Leading Role, the Teen Choice Award for Choice Chemistry (shared with Hugh Grant), the Teen Choice Award for Choice Liplock (shared with Grant), and the Dallas–Fort Worth Film Critics Association Award for Best Actress.

Colin Firth won the European Film Awards Audience Award for Best Actor and the European Film Award – Jameson People's Choice Award – Best Actor and was nominated for the BAFTA Award for Best Actor in a Supporting Role and the Satellite Award for Best Actor – Motion Picture Musical or Comedy.

Hugh Grant won the Evening Standard British Film Awards' Peter Sellers Award for Comedy and was nominated for the Empire Award for Best British Actor, the Satellite Award for Best Supporting Actor – Motion Picture Musical or Comedy, and the European Film Award – Jameson People's Choice Award – Best Actor.

Richard Curtis, Andrew Davies, and Helen Fielding were nominated for the BAFTA Award for Best Adapted Screenplay.

The film was nominated for the BAFTA Award for Best British Film, the Golden Globe Award for Best Motion Picture – Musical or Comedy, and the Satellite Award for Best Film – Musical or Comedy.

Soundtrack

The film's soundtrack was composed by Patrick Doyle. It also features two hit songs that were released as singles, "Out of Reach" by Gabrielle and "It's Raining Men" by Geri Halliwell. The single became Halliwell's fourth consecutive number-one hit single in UK Singles Chart and it became her most successful solo single to date. "Feels Like Sex", another song from the album was originally slated as the lead single, but after "It's Raining Men" was offered to Halliwell, the song was released as the first single, and was added to Scream if You Wanna Go Faster.

Halliwell's version received positive reviews by music critics, experienced international success and hit the top ten in over two dozen countries around the world, going to number one in several of them, although it did not fare as well on the American charts. However, in the United Kingdom, "It's Raining Men" debuted at number-one on the UK Singles Chart and stayed there for two weeks. It became Halliwell's fourth consecutive number-one single in the UK, selling 155,000 units in its first week and 80,000 in its second week. Overall the single went on to sell 440,000 copies in Britain alone, becoming the 13th best seller of 2001 and Halliwell's most successful single worldwide.

The song was a big success in France where it was certified "Diamond" by the Syndicat National de l'Édition Phonographique (SNEP). With this song, Geri Halliwell won the International Song of the Year award at the 2002 NRJ Music Awards in France. A remix of the song, The Almighty Mix from the Toshiba-EMI series "Dance Mania", volume 20 was also featured in the 2002 Japanese video games, DDRMAX2 Dance Dance Revolution 7thMix and Dance Dance Revolution EXTREME. This version of the song was used as the theme song in the advertisements for New Talent Singing Awards Vancouver Audition 2003. In July 2006 the song entered at seventy-nine on the Mexican Digital Sales Chart, spending two weeks inside the Top 100.

Halliwell was inspired by the 1980 film Fame for the video. She said, "I was just watching Fame on video and I thought what a great excuse". During the video she also does ballet.

Bridget Jones's Diary 2: More Music from the Motion Picture and Other V.G. Songs

 Tracklisting 
 "Me and Mrs. Jones" by The Dramatics
 "Someone Like You" by Van Morrison
 "My Lovin' (You're Never Gonna Get It)" by En Vogue
 "My Funny Valentine" by Elvis Costello
 "Ain't No Mountain High Enough" by Diana Ross
 "Yes" by McAlmont and Butler
 "Woman" by Neneh Cherry
 "Without You" by Nilsson
 "Do What You Gotta Do" by Nina Simone
 "Say What You Want" by Texas
 "Brass in Pocket" by The Pretenders
 "Out of Reach (Acoustic Version)" by Gabrielle
 "Will You Love Me Tomorrow" by The Shirelles
 "Let's Get It On" by Marvin Gaye
 "Waterfalls" by TLC
 "Angels" by Robbie Williams
 "It Should Have Been Me" by Yvonne Fair
 "Ooo Baby Baby" by Smokey Robinson & The Miracles
 "I Don't Want to Talk About It" by Dina Carroll
 "Passionate Kisses" by Mary Chapin Carpenter

Chart positions

Home media
The film was released on both VHS and DVD in 2001 with the UK VHS release containing over 35 minutes of bonus material which includes: Deleted Scenes, Exclusive Interviews, Bridget's Guide to "Getting It Right". There was also a UK VHS of "The Making of Bridget Jones". In 2011, a Blu-ray of the film was released. A Collector's Edition of the film was released in 2004 on DVD with new bonus material including; The Bridget Phenomenon, The Young And The Mateless, Portrait Of The Makeup Artist, Domestic and International TV Spots, Bridget Jones's Diary Reviews and A Guide to Bridget Britishism.

Connection to Pride and Prejudice
Fielding has stated in many interviews that her novel was based upon both Jane Austen's work Pride and Prejudice and its popular 1995 BBC adaptation. This was also reflected in the decision to cast Colin Firth as Darcy, since he played Mr. Darcy in the BBC adaptation of Pride and Prejudice. This is not the film's only connection to that serial – the screenplay was co-written by Andrew Davies, who had written the adaptation of Austen's novel for the BBC. Crispin Bonham-Carter, who played Mr. Bingley in that adaptation, appeared on the movie in a minor role.

Musical adaptation

The film version is currently being adapted into a musical, set to hit London's West End, although no date has been set. British musician Lily Allen has written the score and lyrics, and Stephen Daldry, best known for his Tony award-winning work on the West End and Broadway productions of Billy Elliot, will be directing, joined by his co-worker Peter Darling, who will serve as choreographer.

An official cast for the production has not yet been announced, but workshops for the show have already begun with television actress and star of Legally Blonde, Sheridan Smith, in the title role.

See also

 Bridget Jones: The Edge of Reason, the sequel
 My Lovely Sam Soon, a Korean series with some thematic and narrative similarities

References

External links

 
 
 
 
 
 Bridget Jones Online Archive

Bridget Jones
2001 films
2001 directorial debut films
2001 romantic comedy films
American romantic comedy films
British romantic comedy films
English-language French films
French romantic comedy films
Films based on British novels
Films based on Pride and Prejudice
Films directed by Sharon Maguire
Films produced by Eric Fellner
Films produced by Tim Bevan
Films scored by Patrick Doyle
Films set in London
Films shot at Shepperton Studios
Films shot in Essex
Films shot in Gloucestershire
Films shot in Hertfordshire
Films shot in London
Films shot in Worcestershire
Films with screenplays by Richard Curtis
Miramax films
StudioCanal films
Universal Pictures films
Working Title Films films
2000s English-language films
2000s American films
2000s British films
2000s French films